The 2021 Southern Conference women's soccer tournament was the postseason women's soccer tournament for the Southern Conference held from October 26 through November 7, 2021. The tournament was held at campus sites, with the higher seed hosting. The ten-team single-elimination tournament consisted of four rounds based on seeding from regular season conference play. The Furman Paladins were the defending champions but were unable to defend their crown, losing 4–2 in the final to the Samford Bulldogs. This was the fourth Southern Conference tournament title for the Samford women's soccer program, all four of which have come under coach Todd Yelton. As tournament champions, Samford earned the Southern Conference's automatic berth into the 2021 NCAA Division I Women's Soccer Tournament.

Seeding 

All ten teams from the regular season qualified for the 2021 Tournament.  Seeding was based on regular season records of each team.  Tiebreakers were required to determine the sixth and sevenths seeds as both UNC Greensboro and The Citadel finished the regular season with 3–4–2 records.  UNC Greensboro defeated The Citadel 5–0 on October 10, and earned the sixth seed, while The Citadel was the seventh seed.  A tiebreaker was also required to determine the eight and ninth seeds as Chattanooga and Wofford finished the regular season with 3–5–1 records.  Chattanooga defeated Wofford 1–0 on October 10 and earned the eight seed, while Wofford was the ninth seed.

Bracket

Source:

Schedule

First Round

Quarterfinals

Semifinals

Final

Statistics

Goalscorers

All-Tournament team

Source:

MVP in bold

References 

2021 Southern Conference women's soccer season
Southern Conference Women's Soccer Tournament